Street Horrrsing is the debut studio album by Fuck Buttons, released on 17 March 2008. It peaked at number 23 on the UK Independent Albums Chart.

Critical reception

At Metacritic, which assigns a weighted average score out of 100 to reviews from mainstream critics, the album received an average score of 80, based on 19 reviews, indicating "generally favorable reviews".

Pitchfork placed it at number 20 on the "50 Best Albums of 2008" list.

Track listing

Personnel
Credits adapted from liner notes.

 Fuck Buttons – music
 Tim Cedar – recording
 John Cummings – recording, mixing
 Bob Weston – mastering
 Benjamin John Power – artwork

Charts

References

External links
 

2008 albums
Fuck Buttons albums
ATP Recordings albums